Heritage University (formerly named Holy Names College and Fort Wright College) is a private university on the Yakama Indian Reservation in Toppenish, Washington. It offers associate, bachelor's, and master's degrees.

History
Founded in 1907 by the Sisters of the Holy Names of Jesus and Mary as Holy Names College in Spokane, Washington, the institution subsequently changed its name to Fort Wright College. In 1982, Fort Wright College moved its administration to Toppenish and was renamed Heritage College, which operated there and in Omak, while maintaining the Spokane campus. Five years later, the Spokane campus was closed.

A fire which started on July 8, 2012, destroyed the university's oldest building, Petrie Hall.

Cooperative agreements

Heritage University offers upper-division classes at three Washington community college campuses to allow students to work toward a four-year degree from Heritage. This cooperative program began in 1993 to allow holders of associate degrees from Big Bend Community College in Moses Lake to apply their credits toward a Heritage bachelor's degree. Similar cooperative arrangements were established with Columbia Basin College in Pasco and Highline Community College in Des Moines in 2003 and 2006, respectively.

References

External links
Official website

Education in Yakima County, Washington
Educational institutions established in 1981
Universities and colleges accredited by the Northwest Commission on Colleges and Universities
Private universities and colleges in Washington (state)
1981 establishments in Washington (state)
Yakama